Labeo senegalensis is a species of freshwater ray-finned fish in the genus Labeo from West Africa.

References 

Labeo
Fish of West Africa
Fish described in 1842
Taxa named by Achille Valenciennes